J. Sylvester Ramsey School was a historic school building located in the Washington Square West neighborhood of Philadelphia, Pennsylvania. It was built in 1850, in a vernacular Greek Revival style. It was a three-story, five bay gable roofed building with a three-story fire tower added in 1894.

It was added to the National Register of Historic Places in 1986.  It has since been demolished.

References

External links
Free Library of Philadelphia: Historical Images of Philadelphia, The J. Sylvester Ramsey School

School buildings on the National Register of Historic Places in Philadelphia
Greek Revival architecture in Pennsylvania
School buildings completed in 1894
Washington Square West, Philadelphia